World of Speed is a massively multiplayer online action racing video game initially developed by Slightly Mad Studios and My.com and subsequently by Saber Interactive, for the PC platform. World of Speed was initially planned as a free-to-play and to be released in 2014. In January 2017 the developers closed the community forums and released a statement that the game was "not yet good enough for our players" and that "the project will be under-going a substantial revision". In August 2017, the game was rereleased on Steam as an Early Access title however on November 13, 2018, in an announcement on Steam, World of Speed was to shut down its servers on December 25.

Gameplay 
World of Speed offers both a solo-player based and a team-based gameplay, in which two teams vie for control of real world circuits and street locations in London, Moscow and Monaco to start. The game features a free for all format with destructible open environments and no rules. Players create or join clubs with others and compete in two versus two or four versus four battles to accomplish the maximum point value and conquer the area. In World of Speed, players earn rewards for successfully completing challenges including clean turns and drafting other cars, in addition to finishing first. These rewards can later be used to upgrade cars and become more competitive in the next event. The game requires offensive and defensive tactics, as each player can track the challenges of rival vehicles and may slam into them to prevent their success.

The game is planned to ever-expand its car range. The different cars vastly ranges from everyday rides, tuners, exotics, muscle cars to fast supercars with hefty performance. It is also officially announced that there will be car customization, both in looks and performance. The custom garages and customization options give players tools to build exactly what they want. A variety of load-outs will be available for numerous car models, with new parts and items awarded as players earn more experience during the races. Players who play as a club can get to a stage where if they have enough winnings, they can customize their own track to host races on. The track can be set up with different logos and emblems for the specific racing club.

The game's initial racing modes are Circuit, Sprint, Drag and Drift stages, including social in-game events such as Clubs where players and teams can communicate and compete in different types of team-based gameplay modes. Players who achieve a certain level in the game as a club gain ownership of the course. Locations can then be fought over in the team-based game mode such as Territory Wars. The Airfield is a non-competitive zone where players can show off theirs cars, meet with clubs, and take a look at the upgraded cars others are driving. Most of the racing tracks in World of Speed consist of different stages, with different levels of difficulty. Some parts/stages of each track have long straight high-speed roads, while others have more turns and elevation (e.g. mountain passes) and sharp hairpin turns. This is meant to encourage players to practice driving, and make them carefully think through the best driving styles and driving techniques, as well as the car of their choice. There are currently 15 racing tracks in World of Speed.

References

External links 
 Official World of Speed website
 World of Speed at Steam
 Former official website

Cancelled Windows games
Early access video games
Racing video games
Massively multiplayer online role-playing games
Video games scored by Stephen Baysted
Video games developed in the United Kingdom
Windows games